Daniel Fischer (born 22 July 1997) is an Austrian footballer who plays as a defender for Saint Louis FC in the USL Championship.

Career

Youth, College & Amateur
Fischer spent time with academy teams in Austria, also appearing for the SKN St. Pölten second team in the Austrian Regionalliga.

Following his release from St. Pölten, Fischer went to the United States to play college soccer at Young Harris College. At Young Harris, Fischer played 54 games, scoring 7 goals and tallying 9 assists during three seasons. In his sophomore and junior years, Fischer earned various accolades, including; All-Peach Belt Conference first team (2018), D2CCA NCAA Division II All-Southeast Region first team (2018), All-Peach Belt Conference second team (2019) and the United Soccer Coaches NCAA Division II Men's Scholar All-America team (2019).

While at college, Fischer also played in the USL League Two with Cincinnati Dutch Lions, making three appearances for the club during their 2019 season.

Professional
On 18 December 2019, Fischer signed with USL Championship side Saint Louis FC ahead of their 2020 season. He made his debut on 26 July 2020, appearing as an injury-time substitute during a 1–0 win over Indy Eleven.

References

External links
Dani Fischer - Men's Soccer at Young Harris College
Daniel Fischer at Saint Louis FC

1997 births
Association football defenders
Austrian expatriate footballers
Austrian expatriate sportspeople in the United States
Austrian footballers
Cincinnati Dutch Lions players
Expatriate soccer players in the United States
Living people
Saint Louis FC players
SKN St. Pölten players
USL Championship players
USL League Two players
Young Harris Mountain Lions men's soccer players
People from Hainburg an der Donau
Footballers from Lower Austria